77 Boa Drum is a live album by Japanese experimental music group Boredoms, recorded on July 7, 2007, at the Empire–Fulton Ferry section of Brooklyn Bridge Park in Brooklyn, New York City, New York. It was released on two CDs, plus a 20-minute all-region NTSC DVD documenting the performance, mounted in a large hardcover book with photos and full credits. In Japan the package sells for 7,777 yen (including sales tax), about US$70.

The concert featured the core Boredoms lineup of Yamataka Eye on electronics, vocals and Sevena (a custom-made instrument that, at the performance, was a vertically mounted array of seven electric lap steel guitars played with sticks); Yoshimi P-We; Yojiro Tatekawa; and Muneomi Senju. The band was joined by 74 other drummers (for a total of 77, plus Eye as member 0). Notable participating drummers included Hisham Bharoocha, Andrew W.K., Robin Easton, Aaron Moore, Christopher Powell, David Nuss, Kid Millions, Ryan Sawyer, Tim DeWitt, and Brian Chippendale.

The band organized a sequel concerts, 88 Boadrum, on August 8, 2008, both featuring 88 drummers. One led in LA by the Boredoms, the Other in NY led by the band Gang Gang Dance

Track listing
The album consists of two CDs, each containing only one track.
"77 BOA DRUM PART.1 / SEVEN" – 53:32
"77 BOA DRUM PART.2 / SUN LOARD (sic)" – 46:39

References

Boredoms albums
2008 live albums